Quecholli is the name of the fourteenth  month of the Aztec calendar. It is also a festival in the Aztec religion and the Principal deity is Mixcoatl. It is called the Precious Feather and hunting is done during this season.

References

Aztec calendars
Aztec mythology and religion